Myrtle Hill Memorial Park is a cemetery in Tampa, Florida, in the United States. It was established in 1917, and is located at 4207 East Lake Avenue.  It is owned by Dignity Memorial.

Notable graves
 Gen. Paul DeWitt Adams (1906–1987), US Army general, commanded United States Third Army
 Doyle E. Carlton (1885–1972), 25th Governor of Florida
 Sam Melville Gibbons (1920–2012), US Congressman 1963–1997
 Coe Glade (1900–1985), opera singer
 Gen. John J. Hennessey (1921–2001), US Army general, commanded the 101st Airborne Division in the Vietnam War
 Dennis Hoey (1893–1960), cinema actor
 Dave Lewis (1954–2020), professional football player
 Henry King (1886–1982), film director
 Wallace O. Stovall, Sr. (1891–1966), publisher of The Tampa Tribune
 Ildebrando Zacchini (1868–1948), circus entertainer

References

External links
 
 
 

Buildings and structures in Tampa, Florida
Cemeteries in Florida
1917 establishments in Florida